= Murghai railway station =

Railway station in Pakistan

Coordinates: 28°55′N 70°14′E

General information
- Owner: Ministry of Railways

Other information
- Station code: MGHI

History
- Former names: Great Indian Peninsula Railway
Location

Murghai railway station (Urdu: مرگھائی ریلوے اسٹیشن) is located in Pakistan.

== See also ==
- List of railway stations in Pakistan
- Pakistan Railways
